Shift_JIS art is artwork created from characters in the Shift JIS character set, a superset of the ASCII encoding standard intended for Japanese usage.  Shift_JIS art has become popular on web-based bulletin boards, notably 2channel, and has even made its way into mainstream media and commercial advertising in Japan.

In Japanese media 

The Shift JIS character set is a Japanese Industrial Standards (JIS) superset of JIS X 0201 (in turn almost a superset of ASCII) intended for Japanese usage. Unlike Western ASCII art, which is generally designed to be viewed with a monospaced font, Shift_JIS art is designed around the proportional-width MS PGothic font supplied with Microsoft Windows, which is the default font for web sites in Japanese versions of Windows.  This dependency has led to the development of the free Mona Font, in which each character is the same width as its counterpart in MS PGothic. This is useful on operating systems lacking the PGothic font, such as Linux.

Within the Japanese community, Shift_JIS art is sometimes abbreviated as SJIS art, but is most commonly referred to as "AA" meaning ASCII art, although it rarely restricts itself to the 95 printable characters within the ASCII standard. As with ANSI art, SJIS art is sometimes used for animation. However, due to technical advances, SJIS art also appears in the form of Adobe Flash files and animated GIFs.

The Japanese movie and television show, frequently included Shift_JIS art, both during screen transitions and within the story itself.  One of the recurring characters in the TV series was a Shift_JIS artist who would often draw full-screen Shift_JIS works of art as a way of expressing his support and encouraging the lead character. When they got engaged, posts began flowing in congratulating the new couple, and extravagant Shift JIS art pictures were posted.

The Touhou Project meme "Yukkuri shite itte ne!" comes from a Shift_JIS attempt to draw the lead characters of Touhou, Reimu and Marisa.

Gallery

See also 

ASCII art
ANSI art
Japanese emoticons
Mona Font

Further reading 

 Tarou, Maruheso, ed.  2ちゃんねる AA大辞典 ("Ni-channeru AA Dai-Jiten" (romanized), meaning "2channel AA BIG Dictionary".) . Tokyo, Japan: Softbank Publishing, 2003.
 2-ten Project, ed.  2典 ～2ちゃんねる辞典～  ("Ni-channeru AA Jiten" (romanized), meaning "2channel AA Dictionary".) . Virtual Cluster / Book-ing, 2002.

External links 
 A collection of Shift_JIS art at text-mode.tumblr.com
 
 2ch.net AA Saloon (in Japanese)
 4-ch.net ASCII Art board
 Japanese Ascii Art.image

Japanese art
Internet culture
2channel
ASCII art
Fictional cats
Articles with underscores in the title

ja:アスキーアート#日本での使用